HD 133002 (HR 5596) is a possible binary star in the northern constellation of Ursa Minor. With an apparent visual magnitude of 5.65, it is faintly visible to the naked eye. (According to the Bortle scale, it can be viewed from dark rural skies.) The high declination of +82.5° means it is hidden from view from most of the southern hemisphere. Parallax measurements yield an estimated distance of around 142 light years from the Sun. The system is drifting closer with a heliocentric radial velocity of −44 km/s.

This is a G-type main sequence star with a stellar classification of G2V, although it has also been classified as F9V or G0V.  With spectral absorption lines of metals and absorption bands of some molecules weaker than expected based on its hydrogen lines, it is defined as a weak line star.  Based on its G-band strengths, it would we given a class of G0, and based on its metal lines a class of G1.

It is estimated to have 51% greater mass than the Sun, and is younger with an age of around 2.8 billion years. The projected rotational velocity along the star's equator is a relatively leisurely 5.2 km/s. The star is considered a photometric solar analog, although it is deficient in elements more massive than helium when compared to the Sun. The chemical composition and relatively low surface gravity for a star of its classification suggest that this may instead be a subgiant star that is in the process of evolving away from the main sequence.

This star has been examined for evidence of an infrared excess, but none was detected. During a 2006−2007 survey of nearby stars, it was discovered that HD 133002 has a low-mass common proper motion stellar companion. This object has an estimated 15% of the Sun's mass. It has a projected separation of around 80 AU from the primary, which suggests an orbital period of roughly 700 years. At present, there is insufficient observational data available to determine orbital elements.

References 

G-type main-sequence stars
Ursa Minor (constellation)
5596
Durchmusterung objects
3876
133002
072573